Bistorta amplexicaulis (synonym Persicaria amplexicaulis), the red bistort or mountain fleece, is a species of flowering plant in the buckwheat family Polygonaceae, native to China, the Himalayas, and Pakistan.

Numerous cultivars have been developed for garden use, including 'Firetail'.

Etymology
The Latin specific epithet amplexicaulis means "clasping or embracing the stem", and refers to the leaves' habit of growing around the stem.

References

Perennial plants
Plants described in 1825
Flora of Asia
amplexicaulis